Aerospace Data Facility-Colorado (ADF-C)  or Space Delta 20 (DEL 20) one of three satellite ground stations operated by the National Reconnaissance Office (NRO) and United States Space Force in the continental United States. Located within Buckley Space Force Base in Aurora, Colorado, the facility is responsible for the command and control of reconnaissance satellites involved in the collection of intelligence information and for the dissemination of that intelligence to other U.S. government agencies.

List of commanders

Col Cary C. Chun, July 2005–August 2007
Col David D. Thompson, July 2007–May 2009
Col Stephen Denker, July 2009–January 2011
Col Ronald L. Huntley, January 2011–August 2012
Col B. Chance Saltzman, June 2012–June 2014
Col Daniel D. Wright III
Brig Gen Christopher Povak, June 2016–August 2019
Col Jacob Middleton Jr., 29 August 2019
Col Robert J. Schreiner, 12 August 2021

See also
 Aerospace Data Facility-East
 Aerospace Data Facility-Southwest

References

National Reconnaissance Office
Deltas of the United States Space Force
Buildings and structures in Arapahoe County, Colorado
National Security Agency facilities